Koschagyl, also known as Qosshaghyl, (Qosşağyl, قوسشاعىل) is a town in Atyrau Region, southwest Kazakhstan.

References

Atyrau Region
Cities and towns in Kazakhstan